DeLee is a surname. Notable people with the surname include:

 Debra DeLee (born 1948), former Chair of the U.S. Democratic National Committee
 Joseph DeLee (1869–1942), American physician and obstetrician

See also
Lee (disambiguation)